Hugo Ellis (born 4 February 1988, in Isleworth, London, England) is a rugby union player who plays as a back-row forward for Rosslyn Park. He is a former pupil of St Benedict's School, Ealing.

In June 2010 Ellis joined Newport Gwent Dragons. He was released by Newport Gwent Dragons at the end of the 2011–12 season.

As well as playing club rugby, Ellis has also been capped by England U-20 – helping them to win the 2008 U-20 Six Nations title.

His brother Arthur Ellis is also a rugby player, currently with Ealing Trailinders, while their father Wyn Ellis played for Neath.

Season-by-season playing stats

Club

International/County/Representative

Honours/Records

England under-20s
 Six Nations U-20 champions: 2008

References

External links
 Guinness Premiership profile
 Newport Gwent Dragons profile

1988 births
Living people
Dragons RFC players
English rugby union players
People educated at St Benedict's School, Ealing
Rosslyn Park F.C. players
Rugby union players from Isleworth
Wasps RFC players
Rugby union number eights